“Crazytown” is a song by Australian rock musician, Diesel. It is the first single from his album Coathanger Antennae. The song was released in May 2006 and peaked at number 39 in Australia.
A live music video was released to promote the single.

Track listing
 "Crazytown" - 3:33
 "Blown To Bits" - 3:56

Charts
“Crazytown" peaked at number 39 in June 2006 in Australia.

Weekly charts

References

2006 singles
2006 songs
Diesel (musician) songs
Songs written by Diesel (musician)